Mudundi Ramakrishna Raju is an Indian physicist, known for his research on the application of nuclear physics to cancer therapy. He hails from the Indian state of Andhra Pradesh and is the Managing Trustee of the International Cancer Center, Mahatma Gandhi Memorial Medical Trust located at Bhimavaram. He is reported to have 35 years of research experience in radiation therapy at various institutions in the US such as Massachusetts General Hospital, Harvard University, Massachusetts Institute of Technology, Lawrence Radiation Laboratory, University of California in Berkeley and Los Alamos National Laboratory and is credited with several articles on the topic. Raju was honored by the Government of India, in 2013, with the fourth highest Indian civilian award of Padma Shri.

See also

 Radiation therapy

References

Living people
Recipients of the Padma Shri in science & engineering
20th-century Indian physicists
People from West Godavari district
Scientists from Andhra Pradesh
Year of birth missing (living people)